The 1948 New Hampshire gubernatorial election was held on November 2, 1948. Republican nominee Sherman Adams defeated Democratic nominee Herbert W. Hill with 52.21% of the vote.

Primary elections
Primary elections were held on September 14, 1948.

Republican primary

Candidates
Sherman Adams, former U.S. Representative
John R. McIntire

Results

General election

Candidates
Major party candidates
Sherman Adams, Republican
Herbert W. Hill, Democratic

Other candidates
Irma C. Otto, Progressive

Results

References

1948
New Hampshire
Gubernatorial